Barboides gracilis is a species of ray-finned fish in the carp and minnow family, Cyprinidae which occurs in small, slow flowing rivers in forests in the coastal lowlands in West Africa from Benin to Equatorial Guinea. It is a small species of 1.6 cm in length which feeds mainly on aquatic plants and detritus. It is threatened by habitat destruction caused by barrage fishing, development and oil exploration.

References

 

Barboides
Fish described in 1929
Barbs (fish)